The women's 1500 metres at the 1996 Asian Winter Games was held on 7 February 1996 in Harbin, China.

Records

Results

References
Results

External links
Changchun 2007 Official website

Women 1500
1996 in women's speed skating